Iqbal is a 2005 Indian Hindi-language coming-of-age sports drama film written and directed by Nagesh Kukunoor.  Produced by Subhash Ghai, under "Mukta Searchlight Films", the story follows a cricket-obsessed deaf and mute boy from a remote Indian village as he aims to overcomes difficulties to become a cricketer and fulfill his dream of playing for the Indian national cricket team. The film received the National Film Award for Best Film on Other Social Issues.

The film was screened retrospective on 18 August 2016 at the Independence Day Film Festival jointly presented by the Indian Directorate of Film Festivals and Ministry of Defense, commemorating 70th Indian Independence Day.

Plot 
Iqbal (Shreyas Talpade) is a deaf and mute boy, who dreams of playing cricket for India. However, he is discouraged by his father who thinks that Iqbal's daydreams are a waste of time. Instead, he wants Iqbal to help him tend to the crops and become a farmer like him, which would be a stable profession.

Iqbal's sister, Khadija (Shweta Prasad), however, helps him try out for a nearby academy run by Guruji (Girish Karnad), an influential former India captain, who accepts him for his talent. However, when Iqbal competes with a rich boy, Kamal, who is also the star of the academy, he is thrown out by Guruji out of fear of Kamal's father, who bankrolls the academy. Iqbal seeks help from the local drunkard, Mohit (Naseeruddin Shah), who was once a great cricketer and persuades him to be his coach. They are able to train in a nearby field, using Iqbal's buffaloes (named after actual members of the Indian cricket team) as fielders.

Mohit trains Iqbal and gets him a place on the Andhra Pradesh Ranji Trophy team, despite Iqbal not having any previous cricketing experience. Iqbal plays marvelously for the team, which was a weak team before he joined, and is soon noticed by the press and cricket selectors alike. However, when the final match of the season pits Iqbal against his rival, Kamal, Guruji tries to bribe Iqbal to bowl badly so that the national team scouts at the game would select Kamal for the national cricket team.

Iqbal succumbs to his offer, out of concern for his father, who is facing financial difficulties and may lose his lands. Luckily, a sports agent is able to offer him a better deal, and Iqbal bowls with his usual fiery pace and wins the match for his team. Surprisingly he also impresses the onlooking national team selector Kapil Dev (in a special guest role), and wins a place in the Indian national cricket team.

In the end Iqbal is shown donning the Indian Cricket Team's Blue Jersey and walking in the ground to make his international debut.

Cast 
Shreyas Talpade as Iqbal, a bowler
Naseeruddin Shah as Mohit Mishra
Girish Karnad as Guruji
Shweta Basu Prasad as Khadija
Yatin Karyekar as Anwar Saeed
Prateeksha Lonkar as Saida
Dilip Salgaonkar as Bipin
Jyoti Joshi as Farida
Adarsh Balakrishna as Kamal
Gururaj Manepalli as Akash
Kapil Dev as Himself (Special Appearance)
D. Santosh as Satish Bhatawdekar

Reception 
Iqbal was well received by critics and audiences alike. The success of the film ensured its director Nagesh Kukunoor the commercial recognition. The film was voted amongst the Ten Hindi Films that is ideal for Training and Motivational material.

Awards 

 51st Filmfare Awards:

Nominated

 Best Director – Nagesh Kukunoor
 Best Supporting Actor – Naseeruddin Shah
 Best Supporting Actress – Shweta Basu Prasad

Other awards
National Film Award for Best Film on Other Social Issues – Nagesh Kukunoor & Subhash Ghai
National Film Award for Best Supporting Actor – Naseeruddin Shah
Zee Cine Award for Best Actor (Critics) – Male – Shreyas Talpade
Zee Cine Award for Best Actor (Critics) – Female - Shweta Prasad
Screen Award for Best Supporting Actress - Shweta Prasad

Music 
The music for the soundtrack was composed by Himesh Reshammiya and Salim Sulaiman and was released under the T-Series label.

See also

List of films featuring the deaf and hard of hearing

References

External links 
 
 BBC film review

2005 films
Indian sports drama films
Films about deaf people
2000s sports drama films
2000s Hindi-language films
Films about cricket in India
Films about disability in India
Films scored by Himesh Reshammiya
Indian Sign Language films
Films featuring a Best Supporting Actor National Film Award-winning performance
Best Film on Other Social Issues National Film Award winners
Films directed by Nagesh Kukunoor
2005 drama films